The Laxminarayan Mandir is a Hindu temple dedicated to Laxminarayan in Delhi, India. Laxminarayan usually refers to Vishnu, the Preserver in the Trimurti, also known as Narayan, when he is together with his consort Lakshmi. The temple, inaugurated by Mahatma Gandhi, was built by Jugal Kishore Birla from 1933 and 1939. The side temples are dedicated to Shiva, Krishna and Buddha.

It was the first large Hindu temple built in Delhi and is often called Birla Mandir due to being constructed by the Birla family. The temple is spread over 3 hectares (7.5 acres), adorned with many shrines, fountains, and a large garden with Hindu and Nationalistic sculptures, and also houses Geeta Bhawan for discourses. The temple is one of the major attractions of Delhi and attracts thousands of devotees on the  festivals of Janmashtami and Diwali.

History

 
The construction of the temple dedicated to Laxmi Narayana started in 1933, built by industrialist and philanthropist, Baldeo Das Birla and his son Jugal Kishore Birla of the Birla family, thus, the temple is also known as Birla Temple. The foundation stone of the temple was laid by Jat Maharaj Udaybhanu Singh. The temple was built under guidance of Pandit Vishwanath Shastri. The concluding ceremony  and Yagna were performed by Swami Keshavanandji.

This is the first of a series of temples built by the Birlas in many cities of India, which are also often called Birla Temple.

Architecture

Its architect was Sris Chandra Chatterjee, a leading proponent of the "Modern Indian Architecture Movement." The architecture was influenced heavily by the principles of the Swadeshi movement of the early
twentieth century and the canonical texts used. The movement did not reject the incorporation of new construction ideas and technologies. Chatterjee extensively used modern materials  in his buildings.

The three-storied temple is built in the northern or Nagara style of temple architecture. The entire temple is adorned with carvings depicting the scenes from golden yuga of the present universe cycle. More than a hundred skilled artisans from Benares, headed by Acharya Vishvanath Shastri, carved the icons of the temple. The highest shikhara of the temple above the sanctum sanctorum is about 49 m (160 feet) high. The temple faces the east and is situated on a high plinth. The shrine is adorned with fresco paintings depicting Shastri's life and work. The icons of the temple are in marble brought from Jaipur. Kota stone from Makarana, Agra, Kota, and Jaisalmer was used in the construction of the temple premises. The Geeta Bhawan to the north of the temple is dedicated to Krishna. Artificial landscape and cascading waterfalls add to the beauty of the temple.

Temple

The main temple houses statues of Narayan and Lakshmi. There are other small shrines dedicated to Shiva, Ganesha and Hanuman. There is also a shrine dedicated to Buddha. The left side temple shikhar (dome) houses Devi Durga, the goddess of Shakti, the power.

Location

The temple is located on the Mandir Marg, situated west of the Connaught Place in New Delhi. The temple is easily accessible from the city by local buses, taxis and auto-rickshaws. The nearest Delhi Metro station is R. K. Ashram Marg metro station, located about 2 km away. Also on the same road lies the New Delhi Kalibari.

See also
Tourist attractions in Delhi

Gallery

References

External links

Laxminarayan Temple, Birla Mandir - thedivineindia.com
Shri Birla Mandir, New Delhi
Laxminarayan Temple
Laxminarayan Temple on Wikimapia

1939 establishments in India
Hindu temples in Delhi
Religious buildings and structures completed in 1939
Vishnu temples
20th-century architecture in India